Jesús Aguilarte ( 1959 – 2 April 2012) was the Governor of Apure State in Venezuela from 1999 to 2000, and from 2004 to 2011. He died in a Maracay hospital on April 2, 2012, after being attacked by a gunman on March 24, 2012. He was 53.

References

1950s births
2012 deaths
Fifth Republic Movement politicians
United Socialist Party of Venezuela politicians
Governors of Apure
Assassinated Venezuelan politicians
Deaths by firearm in Venezuela
People murdered in Venezuela
2012 murders in Venezuela